Șarba River may refer to:

 Șarba, a tributary of the Jiul de Vest in Gorj County
 Șarba, a tributary of the Slimnic in Sibiu County